is a town located in Tochigi Prefecture, Japan. , the town had an estimated population of 39,158 in 16,149 households, and a population density of 640 persons per km².

Geography
Mibu is located in south-central Tochigi Prefecture. The town is situated in the northern portion of the Kanto plain and is mostly flat terrain with an elevation of 50 to 100 meters above sea level. The Kurokawa River flows through the town. The is about 90 kilometers north of Tokyo metropolis, and is bordered by the prefectural capital of Utsunomiya to the north. Approximately a third of the land area of the town is covered in rice paddy.

Surrounding municipalities
Tochigi Prefecture
 Utsunomiya
 Kanuma
 Tochigi
Shimotsuke

Climate
Mibu has a Humid continental climate (Köppen Cfa) characterized by warm summers and cold winters with heavy snowfall.  The average annual temperature in Mibu is 13.8 °C. The average annual rainfall is 1385 mm with September as the wettest month. The temperatures are highest on average in August, at around 26.1 °C, and lowest in January, at around 2.4 °C.

Demographics
Per Japanese census data, the population of Mibu has remained relatively steadily over the past 30 years.

History
The remains of many burial mounds from the Kofun period can be found in Mibu. During the Edo period, the area was controlled by Mibu Domain under the Tokugawa shogunate. The jōkamachi which grew up around Mibu Castle was Mibu-shuku a post station on a branch the Nikkō Kaidō connecting Edo with the shrines at Nikkō. After the Meiji restoration, Mibu town and the villages of Inaba and Minami-Inukai were created within Shimotsuga District on April 1, 1889 with the creation of the modern municipalities system. Inaba merged with Mibu on November 3, 1954 followed by Minami-Inukai on July 28, 1955.

Government
Mibu has a mayor-council form of government with a directly elected mayor and a unicameral town council of 16 members. Mibu contributes one member to the Tochigi Prefectural Assembly. In terms of national politics, the town is part of Tochigi 4th district of the lower house of the Diet of Japan.

Economy
The economy of Mibu is heavily dependent on agriculture; however, the town is increasingly becoming a commuter town for neighboring Utsunomiya.

Education

Dokkyo Medical University
Mibu has eight public primary schools and two public middle schools operated by the town government. The town has one public high school operated by the Tochigi Prefectural Board of Education. 
 (栃木県立壬生高等学校)
Mibu Municipal Mibu Junior High School (壬生町立壬生中学校)
Mibu Municipal Minami Inukai Junior High School (壬生町立南犬飼中学校)

Transportation

Railway
  Tobu Railway – Tobu Utsunomiya Line
 -  -  -

Highway
  – Mibu Parking Area and Mibu Interchange

Local attractions
Mibumachi Toy Museum
Site of Mibu Castle
Atagozuka Kofun, National Historic Site
Kurumazuka Kofun, National Historic Site
Ushizuka Kofun, National Historic Site
Azuma Kofun, National Historic Site
Chausuyama Kofun, National Historic Site
 Mibu Ichirizuka, National Historic Site

Noted people from Mibu
Ennin, noted Buddhist prelate
Yuko Oshima, actress and singer
Tsutomu Sato, politician
Kazuyoshi Saito, singer-songwriter

References

External links

Official Website 

Towns in Tochigi Prefecture
Mibu, Tochigi